is a Japanese actress.

Life and career
Suzuki appeared in Shinji Aoyama's Mike Yokohama: A Forest with No Name and Yōichi Sai's Blood and Bones.

She won the Best Actress award at the 1998 Yokohama Film Festival for her role in Welcome Back, Mr. McDonald, at the 42nd Blue Ribbon Awards for Keiho and at the 2011 Tokyo Drama Awards for Second Virgin.

Filmography

Film

Television

Honours
Kinuyo Tanaka Award (2014)

References

External links
  
 
 

1968 births
Living people
People from Sendai
Japanese television actresses
Japanese film actresses
Asadora lead actors